The Eastern Hockey Federation is an independent American Youth Minor ice hockey league.  Established in early 2004, when the Bay State Breakers, Boston Jr. Eagles, Boston Jr. Terriers, Bridgewater Bandits, Middlesex Islanders,  Minuteman Flames, Providence Capitals, South Shore Kings, and Top Gun left the Metropolitan Boston Hockey League.

Its stated goal is to foster and govern an elite amateur minor hockey league comprising the top youth hockey organizations in the region.

History
During the league's inaugural 2004–2005 season, ten programs committed to participate:

Bay State Breakers
Boston Jr. Bruins
Boston Jr. Eagles
Boston Jr. Terriers
Boston Bandits
Middlesex Islanders
Minuteman Flames
Providence Capitals
South Shore Kings
Top Gun
 
During the summer of 2005, the Eastern Hockey Federation announced that three new teams would be joining the league for the 2005–2006 season:

Connecticut Riptide
Portland Jr. Pirates
Brewster Bulldogs

In March 2006 the Eastern Hockey Federation's board of directors announced that the Exeter Freeze would be joining the League for the 2006–2007 season. The board also announced the establishment of a Western Division for the '06-07 season that would consist of two New York-based organizations—the Westchester Express and the Syracuse Stars.

Later that month, the Eastern Hockey Federation revealed that the 1A Division would be replaced by the AA Division with nine teams aligned to compete in that grouping:

Bay State Breakers
Bridgewater Bandits
Connecticut Riptide
Exeter Freeze
MassConn Braves
Minuteman Flames
New England Moose
Team Dynamic
Top Gun
New England Junior Falcons

Also, in 2009 the Boston Little Rangers were added to the league.

On March 6, 2011, the New England Junior Falcons joined the Eastern Hockey Federation.

On May 29, 2013, Eastern Hockey Federation announced the addition of two new AAA programs, The New England Bulldogs and the North Shore Shamrocks, will be joining the Eastern Hockey Federation's AAA division as well as the Eastern Minor Hockey League for the upcoming 2013–2014 season.

On June 14, 2018, the Eastern Hockey Federation announced it would be merging with the United States Premier Hockey League. The team Elite and Tier I teams and structure remained. The merger allowed the new Eastern Hockey Federation Selects Midget division to be scheduled with United States Premier Hockey League's full season Midget teams.

On March 8, 2019, the Eastern Hockey Federation announced plans to integrate the United States Premier Hockey League's High Performance Youth Division and create a South division, expanding the league's footprint into the Mid-Atlantic region. The South Division began their inaugural season on September 14, 2019.

See also
List of ice hockey leagues

External links
Official EHF Website
Official USA Hockey Website

Ice hockey in New England
Ice hockey leagues in the United States
Recurring sporting events established in 2004
Sports leagues established in 2004
Youth ice hockey